"You Are" is the debut single by American Christian rock recording artist Colton Dixon. It was written by Dixon and busbee while the song's production was handled by Sparrow Records and appears on Dixon's debut album as well as his third album in acoustic form.

Live performance
Dixon has performed the song as a special guest on Third Day's 'Miracle Tour' from February 21, 2013, until May 19, 2013.

Music video
An official lyric video was released by Colton's VEVO channel on November 28, 2012.

Charts

Release history

References

2012 debut singles
2012 songs
Songs written by busbee
Sparrow Records singles